The Annie Award for Music in an Animated Television/Broadcasting Production is an Annie Award given annually to the best music composed for animated television or broadcasting productions. It was first given at the 25th Annie Awards, initially the category included both scores and songs from television productions.

At the 28th Annie Awards, two categories were created, though both were only presented that year, one was for music scores especifically made for  television productions under the name of Outstanding Individual Achievement for Music Score in an Animated Television Production, while the other category was to reward songs from both films and television productions named Outstanding Individual Achievement for a Song in an Animated Production. Since the 30th Annie Awards, the category Outstanding Achievement for Music in a Television/Broadcast Production is presented.

Winners and nominees

1990s
 Best Individual Achievement: Music in a Television Production

2000s

 Outstanding Individual Achievement for a Song in an Animated Production

 Outstanding Individual Achievement for Music Score in an Animated Television Production

 Ooutstanding Achievement for Music in an Animated Television Production

2010s

2020s

See also
 Primetime Emmy Award for Outstanding Music Composition for a Series
 Primetime Emmy Award for Outstanding Original Music and Lyrics

References

External links 
 Annie Awards: Legacy

Annie Awards
Music awards